Jean-Marc de La Sablière (born 8 November 1946, in Athens) has been the Ambassador of France in Italy between 2007 and 2011.  Prior to this, he was the Permanent Representative of France to the United Nations from 2002 to 2007.

He arrived at the UN in 2002. For the previous two years he had been diplomatic adviser to President Chirac. He is an alumnus of the École Nationale d'Administration (ÉNA). La Sablière also graduated from the Paris Institute of Political Studies (Sciences Po).

Honors
Officer of the Légion d'honneur
Chevalier of the Ordre national du Mérite

References

|-

1946 births
Living people
Permanent Representatives of France to the United Nations
Ambassadors of France to Italy
Sciences Po alumni
École nationale d'administration alumni
Officiers of the Légion d'honneur
Knights of the Ordre national du Mérite
Recipients of the Order of the Cross of Terra Mariana, 3rd Class